Two ships and a shore establishment of the Royal Navy have borne the name HMS Boscawen, after Admiral Edward Boscawen, whilst another ship was planned:

  was a 4-gun cutter purchased in 1763 and sold in 1773.
 HMS Boscawen was to have been an 80-gun second rate ship of the line.  She was laid down in 1811 but subsequently cancelled.
  was a 70-gun third rate launched in 1844.  She was converted into a training ship in 1874 and was renamed Wellesley.  She was damaged by fire in 1914 and was subsequently broken up.
  was a training establishment in a number of locations, in service from 1862 to 1922 at Portland and later Shotley, and again from 1932 to 1947.  A number of ships were renamed HMS Boscawen whilst serving as homes for the base:
  was HMS Boscawen from 1873 to 1906.
  was HMS Boscawen II from 1893 to 1904, and HMS Boscawen from 1904 to 1905.
  was HMS Boscawen III from 1905 to 1906.

Royal Navy ship names

sl:HMS Boscawen